Nguyễn Anh Khôi (born 11 January 2002) is a Vietnamese chess Grandmaster (GM) (2019), two-times Vietnamese Chess Championships winner (2016, 2019).

Biography
Nguyễn Anh Khôi won Asian Youth Championship in U10 (2012) and U12 (2014) age groups.
Also he won World Youth Chess Championship in U10 (2012) and U12 (2014) age groups. In 2019, Nguyễn Anh Khôi won the Asian Junior Chess Championship.

Nguyễn Anh Khôi twice won Vietnamese Chess Championships in 2016 and 2019.

Nguyễn Anh Khôi played for Vietnam in the Chess Olympiads:
 In 2016, at fourth board in the 42nd Chess Olympiad in Baku (+4, =4, -3),
 In 2018, at fourth board in the 43rd Chess Olympiad in Batumi (+4, =6, -1).

In 2017, he was awarded the FIDE International Master (IM) title and received the FIDE Grandmaster (GM) title two years later.

References

External links
 
 
 

2002 births
Living people
Vietnamese chess players
Chess grandmasters
Chess Olympiad competitors
Sportspeople from Ho Chi Minh City